Tillie's Punctured Romance is a lost 1928 American silent circus comedy film starring W. C. Fields as a ringmaster and Louise Fazenda as a runaway.  Written by Monte Brice and Keene Thompson and directed by A. Edward Sutherland, this film has nothing to do with the 1914 Charlie Chaplin film aside from sharing the same title, but Chester Conklin and Mack Swain appear in both films.

Plot synopsis
Tillie is a runaway who goes to Frisbee's Colossal Circus, with lions, a ringmaster that wants to take over the circus from the owner, a strong woman, a girl with "a voice of gold and an arm of iron". The group decides to go to the French trenches during World War I in order to entertain the troops, but they all get caught up in a draft and end up serving the German Army as privates while facing the Allies.

Cast

 W.C. Fields as Ringmaster
 Louise Fazenda as Tillie, a Runaway
 Chester Conklin as Circus Owner
 Mack Swain as Tillie's Father
 Doris Hill as Heroine
 Grant Withers as Hero
 Tom Kennedy as Property Man
 Babe London as Strong Woman
 Billy Platt as Midget (billed as William Platt)
 Michael Raffetto as (uncredited)

References

External links
 

1928 films
American black-and-white films
American silent feature films
Films directed by A. Edward Sutherland
Circus films
1928 comedy films
Silent American comedy films
Lost American films
1928 lost films
Lost comedy films
1920s American films